Tölöykön is a village in Osh Region of Kyrgyzstan. It is part of the Mangyt rural community, Aravan District. Its population was 4,073 in 2021.

References

Populated places in Osh Region